Harold Allen Schaitberger (born June 24, 1946) is an American labor leader who served as General President of the International Association of Fire Fighters from 2000 to 2021.

Harold A. Schaitberger is the ninth president in the IAFF's 100-year history, and was the first to have been elected by acclamation in 2000. He was re-elected to another four-year term in August 2016. Under his leadership, the IAFF's Political Action Committee, FIREPAC, grew to more than $4.6 million and ranks among the top one percent of PACs in the nation. Schaitberger focused on ensuring that the IAFF supports candidates and lawmakers who are friendly to firefighters and their issues, regardless of political party.

Prior to Schaitberger's first election as IAFF General President, he had served on the union's headquarters staff as a top advisor to three IAFF Presidents since 1976, and as President of the Virginia Professional Firefighters union since 1973. In 1970, he was elected as the first president of the local affiliate of the IAFF in Fairfax County, Virginia. He began his professional career as a firefighter rising to the rank of lieutenant.

Schaitberger was a member of the Homeland Security Advisory Council.  He did not seek re-election as IAFF General President in 2021, and his successor is Edward Kelly.

References

External links
 Harold A. Schaitberger-General President-International Association of Fire Fighters 
 

American firefighters
American trade union leaders
AFL–CIO people
Trade unionists from Virginia 
People from Fairfax County, Virginia
1946 births
Living people